Ervin Dionté Harris (born July 24, 1991), better known by his stage name Dionté BOOM, is an American rapper-producer. He is currently based in Little Rock, and signed to Day By Day Entertainment.

Career
Dionté BOOM released his debut mixtape, Concrete Lessons, in 2010. Beats Is Art (Prelude), was released by Day By Day Entertainment in 2011.

BOOM released the EP, In Motion in May 2013. In December 2014 his song "High Horse" was featured on Stones Throw Records "La 2 London" podcast. The Aswé A EP followed in December 2014. The song "Lickin'" was published by Arkansas Times in a 2014 issue of the journal Rock Candy, song "Fish Market" in a 2015 issue.

Discography

Mixtapes
 Concrete Lessons (2010)
 Herbal Discussion (2010)
 Beats Is Art (Prelude) (2011)
 Beats Is Art (2011)
 Beats Is Art III (2011)
 Hammer Bite (2015)

EPs
 Herbal Discussion Vol. 2 (2013)
 In Motion (2013)
 Aswé A (2014)
 Mountains & Trails (2017)

Singles
 "Fat Boi Fat Boi" (2012) with KVZE
 "Nasty Narrative" (2012)
 "Lickin'" (2014)
 "Fish Market" (2015) with Celestaphone
 ''Still Got Sum'' (Freestyle) (2016)
 "Spring Cleaning'' (2017)
 "The News" (2017)

References

External links

 
 

1991 births
African-American male rappers
American male rappers
African-American songwriters
Alternative hip hop musicians
Living people
Songwriters from Arkansas
Underground rappers
American hip hop record producers
21st-century American rappers
21st-century American male musicians
21st-century African-American musicians
American male songwriters